The Beniker Gang is a 1984 American drama film written by Jeffrey Kindley and directed by Ken Kwapis (in his feature film directorial debut). The film stars Andrew McCarthy as Arthur Beniker, Jennifer Dundas as Cassie Beniker, Charles Fields as Edmund Beniker, and Danny Pintauro as Ben Beniker.

Plot
Five orphans run away from an orphanage in hopes of becoming a family together.

Cast
 Andrew McCarthy as Arthur Beniker
 Jennifer Dundas as Cassie Beniker
 Charles Fields as Edmund Beniker
 Jeff Alan-Lee as James Beniker
 Danny Pintauro as Ben Beniker
 George Martin as Judge Pink
 Will Patton as Forest Ranger
 J. T. Walsh as Principal Stoddard
 Mary Hamill as Edith Stamwick
 William Duell as Postmaster Greaves
 Anthony Heald as Mr. Uldrich
 Richmond Hoxie as Attorney
 Peter McRobbie as Mr. Millhauser
 Paddy Croft as Mrs. O'Malley
 Joyce Reehling as Miss Nickerson
 Martha Byrne as Molly Stamwick
 Stacey Glick as Orie Stamwick
 Bill Smitrovich as Laundry Truck Driver

References

External links
 
 

1984 films
1984 directorial debut films
1984 drama films
American drama films
Films about orphans
Films set in New Jersey
Films directed by Ken Kwapis
Warner Bros. films
1980s English-language films
1980s American films